The Ship of Lost Souls or The Ship of Lost Men (German: Das Schiff der verlorenen Menschen) is a 1929 German silent thriller film directed by Maurice Tourneur and starring Fritz Kortner, Marlene Dietrich and Robin Irvine.

It was Dietrich's last silent film before The Blue Angel made her an international star. It was shot at the Staaken Studios in Berlin, and partly on location around Rostock. The film's sets were designed by the art directors Franz Schroedter and Fritz Maurischat. It premièred on 17 September 1929 at the Ufa-Pavillon am Nollendorfplatz in Berlin.

Cast

References

Bibliography
 Waldman, Harry. Maurice Tourneur: The Life and Films. McFarland, 2001.
 Wood, Ean. Divine Dietrich: Venus in Tails. Sanctuary, 2002.

External links

1929 films
Films of the Weimar Republic
Films directed by Maurice Tourneur
German silent feature films
German thriller films
1920s thriller films
Seafaring films
Films shot at Staaken Studios
German black-and-white films
Silent adventure films
Silent thriller films
1920s German films